"Hang On to Your Love" is a 1989 song by Australian singer Jason Donovan. It was released in 1990 as the second single from his second album Between the Lines, on which it appears as the second track. Produced by Stock Aitken Waterman, the song was a top ten hit in the UK and in Ireland. The music video accompagning the song was directed by Paul Goldman. The B-side, "You Can Depend on Me", is not another track from the Between the Lines album, but features on Donovan's previous album, Ten Good Reasons.

Chart performance
Like Donovan's previous singles, "Hang On to Your Love" was a top ten hit in UK and Ireland, peaking respectively at number eight and at number three. It achieved a moderate success in other European countries, peaking at number 12 in Belgium (Flanders), 21 in Finland, 26 in the Netherlands and 51 in Germany where it charted for 13 weeks. On the Eurochart Hot 100, it debuted at a peak of number 23 where it stayed for three consecutive weeks, and remained on the chart for a total of nine weeks. It reached number 30 on the European Airplay Chart.

Formats and track listings
 7" single
 "Hang On to Your Love" — 3:00
 "You Can Depend on Me" — 3:32

 12" maxi
 "Hang On to Your Love" (extended version) — 6:47
 "Hang On to Your Love" (instrumental) — 3:48
 "You Can Depend on Me" — 3:32

 CD maxi
 "Hang On to Your Love" (extended version) — 6:47
 "Hang On to Your Love" (instrumental) — 3:48
 "You Can Depend on Me" — 3:32

Charts

References

1989 songs
1990 singles
Jason Donovan songs
Song recordings produced by Stock Aitken Waterman
Songs written by Matt Aitken
Songs written by Mike Stock (musician)
Songs written by Pete Waterman
Pete Waterman Entertainment singles